Héctor Machito Camacho Herrera Jr. (born September 20, 1978) is an American-born Puerto Rican professional boxer and published writer residing in Phoenix, Arizona, United States. He started boxing professionally at the age of 18 years old. He is the son of the late three-time world champion Héctor "Macho" Camacho and the nephew of Felix "Showtime" Camacho. In 2007, 2010, 2014, and 2016, he won the World Boxing Council (WBC) Caribbean Boxing Federation (CABOFE) Light Middleweight title. His mother was born in Monterrey, Nuevo León, Mexico.

Early life and education
Hector Camacho Jr. was born and raised in New York City. His parents were quite young and did not marry; his father was Hector Camacho, then 16 years old, who lived in Spanish Harlem. The senior Camacho, nicknamed "Macho", became an amateur boxer and, later a professional.

The boy was nicknamed "Machito". He grew up admiring his father's fighting skills and imitating him, and was more interested in fighting than school. At the age of eight, Camacho Jr. was noted for doing mock sparring with his dad before his father's world title defense on June 13, 1986, against Edwin Rosario at Madison Square Garden in New York City. That night, the boy wore a Puerto Rican flag outfit.

Professional career
His fight against the former world champion Jesse James Leija resulted in a no contest, after Leija's team protested the awarding of the fight on points to Camacho. The fight was stopped in the fifth round due to an unintentional headbutt by Leija that opened a cut over Camacho's eye. Camacho indicated he did not want to continue. The referees went to their scorecards to determine the winner, and gave Camacho the decision. Many fans felt he quit in the fight.

Camacho is a member of Team Fight to Walk, which raises money to support spinal cord research. Other boxers, including Boyd Melson, Demetrius Andrade, Shawn Estrada, Steve Cunningham and Deandre Latimore, help support this organization.

In 2002, Camacho lost for the first time, to Omar Weis from Argentina, by a decision in ten rounds.

On July 9, 2005, Camacho Jr. and his father co-starred an undercard in Tucson, Arizona. After riding into the ring on a fake bull, Camacho Jr. proceeded to knock out Francisco Barra in the second round. A riot in the audience followed his father's win that night; it is not known if Camacho Jr. had a role in the riot.

Camacho fought against Andrey Tsurkan at the Boardwalk Hall in Atlantic City, New Jersey on June 10, 2006. Tsurkan won by a TKO in the 8th round.

In July 2007, Camacho lost a decision to Don Juan Futrell. Camacho came in overweight at 161 pounds and was outworked by the 150-pound Futrell. Sports journalists thought Camacho's hopes for any future title contention were in doubt based on his condition and performance in that fight.

Suspended
In December 2008, Camacho was indefinitely suspended by the Puerto Rico Boxing Commission as a result of his cancelling a bout with Yory Boy Campas in November in Tijuana, Mexico. Camacho had denied signing for that bout.

Caribbean light middleweight title
Camacho got back into shape and on August 29, 2009, he defeated Israel Cardona for the vacant WBC Caribbean Boxing Federation (CABOFE) Light Middleweight title. In an interview prior to the match, Camacho said that his passion for boxing had been re-ignited and he wanted to win a world title.

On October 30, 2009, Camacho Jr. fought Luis "Yory Boy" Campas in El Paso, Texas. Camacho won the 10-round bout by a split decision, with the scores of 96–91 and 95–92 for him, and 92–95 for Campas. This was a sort of "revenge", as Campas had a draw with the fighter's father, Héctor Camacho, just a few months before.

Camacho was reported to have challenged the former Champion Fernando Vargas, but no fight resulted.

On October 29, 2010 Camacho was knocked out by David Lemieux, then the undefeated middleweight contender, in the first round at the Bell Centre, in Montreal, Quebec, Canada.

Personal life
In 2013, Camacho said in an interview that it was his father's death and his conversion to Islam that helped him make his comeback into boxing. On September 1, 2014, a book written by Camacho, Jr. was published. The book, "Macho Dad", is a comic book that portrays his dad as a Puerto Rican flag-wearing superhero.

Professional boxing record 

|-
| style="text-align:center;" colspan="8"|58 Wins (32 knockouts), 6 Losses, 1 Draws
|-  style="text-align:center; background:#e3e3e3;"
|  style="border-style:none none solid solid; "|Res.
|  style="border-style:none none solid solid; "|Record
|  style="border-style:none none solid solid; "|Opponent
|  style="border-style:none none solid solid; "|Type
|  style="border-style:none none solid solid; "|Rd., Time
|  style="border-style:none none solid solid; "|Date
|  style="border-style:none none solid solid; "|Location
|  style="border-style:none none solid solid; "|Notes
|- align=center
|Win||58–6–1||align=left| Miguel Angel Munguia
|
|
|
|align=left|
|align=left|
|- align=center
|Loss||57–6–1||align=left| Hector Munoz
|
|
|
|align=left|
|align=left|
|- align=center
|Win||57–5–1||align=left| Lee Murtagh
|
|
|
|align=left|
|align=left|
|- align=center
|Loss||56–5–1||align=left| Miguel Angel Munguia
|
|
|
|align=left|
|align=left|
|- align=center
|Win||56–4–1||align=left| Arsenio Terrazas
|
|
|
|align=left|
|align=left|
|- align=center
|Loss||55–4–1||align=left| Luis Grajeda
|
|
|
|align=left|
|align=left|
|- align=center
|Win||55–3–1||align=left| John David Charles
|
|
|
|align=left|
|align=left|
|- align=center
|Win||54–3–1||align=left| Juan Astorga
|
|
|
|align=left|
|align=left|
|- align=center
|Loss||53–3–1||align=left| David Lemieux
|
|
|
|align=left|
|align=left|
|align=left|
|- align=center
|Win||53–2–1||align=left| Denny Dalton
|
|
|
|align=left|
|align=left|
|- align=center

Exhibition boxing record

References

External links
 
 Hector Camacho Jr., Yahoo sports discussion group

1978 births
Living people
Puerto Rican male boxers
Sportspeople from San Juan, Puerto Rico
Winners of the United States Championship for amateur boxers
American male boxers
Puerto Rican Muslims
Puerto Rican boxers of Mexican descent
Puerto Ricans of Mexican descent
People from East Harlem
Converts to Islam
Light-middleweight boxers